Kurnik may refer to
 Kurnik (pirog), a type of Russian pirog
 PlayOK, a website of board and card games formerly known as Kurnik